This is a list of notable people who were either born in County Meath, have lived there for a significant portion of their lives or are otherwise generally associated with the county.

Aristocracy
Nicholas St Lawrence (c. 1550 – 1607), 9th Baron Howth
Egidia de Lacy (1205-?), Lady of Connacht
Hugh de Lacy (c. 1176 – 1242), Earl of Ulster
Hugh de Lacy (c. 1135 – 1186), First Lord of Meath, built Trim Castle
Walter de Lacy (1172–1241), Lord of Meath
Garret Wesley (1735–1781), 1st Earl of Mornington
John Netterville (1603–1659), 2nd Viscount Netterville
Nicholas Netterville (1581–1654), 1st Viscount Netterville
Elizabeth Darcy (1332–1390), Countess of Ormond
Jenet Sarsfield (1528–1598), noblewoman 
Simon Fleming (died 1370), 1st Baron Slane
Lady Anne Culling Smith (1775–1844), sister of the Duke of Wellington
John Barnewall (died 1538), 3rd Baron Trimlestown

Politics
Yemi Adenuga (born 1971), first black woman to be elected to local government in Ireland
Thomas Brennan (1853–1912), co-founder of the Irish National Land League
John Bruton (born 1947), Taoiseach 1994–1997
Christopher Fleming (1669–1726), Member of Parliament
Thomas Fleming (1358–1435), Member of Parliament
Thomas Fleming (died 1601), Member of Parliament
Thomas Hussey (1749–1824), MP for Aylesbury
Sir William Johnson (c. 1715 – 1774), diplomat
Frank McLoughlin (born 1946), TD for Meath
Matthew O'Reilly (1880–1962), TD for Meath
William Wellesley-Pole (1763–1845), Chief Secretary for Ireland
Nicholas Plunkett (1602–1680), Member of Parliament
John Reilly (1646–1717), Member of Parliament
Francis Singleton (1812–1887), member of the Western Australian Legislative Council

Law
John Lowth (1822–1877), lawyer 
Peter Metge (1740–1809), judge
Luke Netterville (1510–1560), judge
Richard Netterville (1540–1607), barrister 
Nicholas Nugent (1525–1582), Solicitor-General for Ireland
Thomas Plunket (1440–1519), Chief Justice of the Common Pleas for Ireland
Thomas Fitz-Christopher Plunket (1407–1471), Lord Chief Justice of Ireland
Richard Plunkett (1340–1393), judge and statesman
Richard Rede (fl. 1416), statesman
Edward George Ryan (1810–1880), 3rd chief justice of the Wisconsin Supreme Court
Patrick Segrave(died 1610), judge
Richard Segrave (1540–1598), judge
James Alleyn (died 1457), Lord Chief Justice of Ireland
William Skrene (1350–1421), Chief Baron of the Irish Exchequer
Barnaby Skurloke (1520–1587), lawyer
Richard Sydgrave (died 1425), Chief Baron of the Irish Exchequer
Richard White (died 1367), Lord Chief Justice of Ireland
Patrick White (1480–1561), Baron of the Court of Exchequer

Military
Guy Johnson (c. 1740 – 1788), British officer in the American Revolutionary War
Patrick James Leonard (1847–1899),  United States Army sergeant and Medal of Honor recipient
Tony Magan (1910–1981), Chief of Staff of the IRA
Simon Mangan (died 1906), Lord Lieutenant of Meath
Thomas Meredyth (died 1719), officer
John Nangle (died 1508), soldier
Richard Ridgeway (1848–1924), Victoria Cross recipient
Frederick Augustus Smith (1826–1887), Victoria Cross recipient 
Thomas Sullivan (1859–1940), soldier and US Medal of Honor recipient 
Thomas Preston (1585–1655), soldier and mercenary 
Peter Warren (1703–1752), Royal Navy officer
Arthur Wellesley (1769–1852), defeated Napoleon at the Battle of Waterloo

Royalty
Máel Dóid mac Suibni (died 653), King of Uisneach
Máel Sechnaill mac Máele Ruanaid (died 862), High King of Ireland
Rose Ní Conchobair (fl. 1180), Lady of Meath
Cormac mac Art Ó Melaghlain (1182–1239), King of Meath
Órlaith íngen Cennétig (died 941), Queen of Ireland
Tigernach mac Fócartai (died 865), King of Loch Gabhair
Túathal Máelgarb (died 540s), High King of Ireland
Donnell Mor Mideach Ua Conchobair (1144–1176), Prince of Connacht

Sports
Adrian Maguire (born 1971), trainer and jockey
Dónal McDermott (born 1989), footballer
Séamus McDonagh (born 1962), boxer
Jamie McGrath (born 1996), footballer
Éamonn O'Brien (Gaelic football manager) (born 1960), Meath GAA manager
Georgie Poynton (born 1997), footballer
Gary Rogers (born 1981), football goalkeeper 
Edward Rooney (1880–1950), cricketer
Tom Sheridan (born 1969), handball player
Brian Smyth (1924–2016), Gaelic Footballer
Adderley Wilkinson (1887–1978), cricketer

Religion
Felim of Kilmore (6th century), saint
Ia of Cornwall (died 5th century), saint
Lommán of Trim (died 6th century), saint
Mac Nisse of Connor (died 514), saint
Tola of Clonard (died 700s), saint
Robert Barnewall (1704–1779), religious rights activist 
Thomas Hussey (1746–1803), bishop and diplomat
James Keene (1849–1919), bishop 
Richard Lacy (1841–1929), Bishop of Middlesbrough
Petronilla de Meath (1300–1324), first known person in Ireland to be burned for heresy
Thomas Messingham (died 1638), hagiologist 
Denis Nulty (born 1963), Bishop of Kildare and Leighlin
Thomas Nulty (1818–1898), Bishop of Meath
Eugene O'Growney (1863–1899), priest
Peter Joseph O'Reilly (1850–1923), Auxiliary bishop of Peoria
John Payne (died 1507), Bishop of Meath
Oliver Plunkett (1625–1681), Archbishop of Armagh
Joseph Rooney (died 1857), missionary
Secundinus (died 448), Bishop of Armagh
Michael Smith (born 1940), Bishop of Meath
Paul Tighe (born 1958), prelate
Walter Wellesley (1470–1539), Bishop of Kildare
William Walsh (1512–1577), Bishop of Meath

Entertainment
Pierce Brosnan (born 1953), actor
Ryan, Scott and Kelly Fitzsimons, Youtubers (Little Lizard Adventures and Little Kelly)
Robin McAuley (born 1953), rock vocalist
Joe Moore (1894–1926), actor
Matt Moore (1888–1960), actor
Owen Moore (1886–1939), actor
Tom Moore (1883–1955), actor and director
Dylan Moran, comedian
Henry Mountcharles (born 1951), organiser of the Slane Concert
Daráine Mulvihill (born 1983), television personality 
Sibéal Ní Chasaide (born 1998), singer
Bláthnaid Ní Chofaigh (born 1970), television presenter
Maighréad Ní Dhomhnaill (born 1955), singer
Sinéad Noonan (born 1987), model
Ciarán Ó Cofaigh (born 1968), director and producer
Hector Ó hEochagáin radio and television presenter
Nathan O'Toole (born 1998), actor
Angela Scanlon (born 1983), television presenter
Tommy Tiernan comedian, actor and television presenter
Sharon Horgan (born 1970), actor
Justine Stafford, comedian and Youtuber

Science and education
Francis Beaufort (1774–1857), hydrographer, creator of the Beaufort scale
Sir Thomas Molyneux (1661–1733), physician
C. Y. O'Connor (1843–1902), engineer
Peadar Ó Gealacáin (1792–1860), scribe
Francis Porter (fl. 1650–1702), professor
Francis Webb Sheilds (1820–1906), engineer

Art and literature
Anthony Holten (1945–2020), author
Francis Ledwidge (1887–1917), poet
J.S. Anna Liddiard (1773–1819), poet
Liam Mac Cóil (born 1952), Irish language novelist 
Séamas Dall Mac Cuarta (c. 1647 – 1733), poet
Seon Mac Solaidh (fl. 1720), poet and scribe
Martina Fitzgerald, journalist and author
Arthur Mathews (born 1959), writer
John Mulvany (1839–1906), artist
Aonghus Fionn Ó Dálaigh (died 1570), poet
Donnchadh Mór Ó Dálaigh (died 1244), poet
Joseph Osborne (1810–1901), author
Edward Lovett Pearce (1699–1733), architect 
Richard Pigott (1835–1889), journalist
John B. Sheridan (1870–1930), sportswriter
Edward Smyth (1749–1812), sculptor 
Gilla Mo Dutu Úa Caiside (fl. 1147), poet
Orla de Brí (born 1965), sculptor

See also
List of Irish people

References

External links
 Roots Ireland - Meath People
 Meath.ie - Famous Meath People

People
Meath
People from County Meath